TV3 Switzerland was a Swiss German-language private television channel, broadcast from 6 September 1999 to 22 December 2001. It was jointly owned by media company Tamedia and the now defunct SBS Broadcasting Group. TV3 aired notable shows such as Big Brother, Expedition Robinson, Popstars, The Bar and Wer wird Millionär?.

See also
Television in Switzerland

References

Defunct television channels in Switzerland
Television channels and stations established in 1999
Television channels and stations disestablished in 2001
1999 establishments in Switzerland
2001 disestablishments in Switzerland
German-language television in Switzerland
Mass media in Zürich